Andreas Poulsen (born 13 October 1999) is a Danish professional footballer who plays as a left-back for Danish Superliga club AaB.

Club career

FC Midtjylland
Poulsen started his career in the local football club, Ikast KFUM. He made his professional debut in the Danish Superliga for FC Midtjylland on 1 December 2016 in a game against Silkeborg IF, where he played the whole game on the left back.

Poulsen won the 'Academy Player of The Year' award at FC Midtjylland for the 2017–18 season.

Borussia Mönchengladbach
After a great 2017–18 season for Poulsen with 12 games played for the first team, Poulsen was sold to Borussia Mönchengladbach for 34 million Danish kroner (€4.5 million) which could further increase to 50 million kroner (€6.7 million). This made him the most expensive teenager in Danish football history. Poulsen signed a five-year contract with the German club.

Austria Wien
On 3 January 2020, it was announced that Poulsen had been loaned to Austria Wien of the Austrian Bundesliga for the remainder of the season.

On 8 February 2021, Poulson moved for a second time to Austria Wien, on a loan deal until the end of the season.

FC Ingolstadt
On 19 August 2021, it was announced that Poulsen had been loaned to 2. Bundesliga side FC Ingolstadt 04, until the end of the season.

AaB
At the end of June 2022 it was confirmed that Poulsen had returned to his homeland, signing a deal until June 2026 with Danish Superliga side AaB.

References

Living people
1999 births
Danish men's footballers
Danish expatriate men's footballers
People from Ikast-Brande Municipality
Association football fullbacks
Denmark under-21 international footballers
Denmark youth international footballers
Sportspeople from the Central Denmark Region
Danish Superliga players
Austrian Football Bundesliga players
Regionalliga players
2. Bundesliga players
FC Midtjylland players
Borussia Mönchengladbach players
FK Austria Wien players
FC Ingolstadt 04 players
AaB Fodbold players
Danish expatriate sportspeople in Germany
Danish expatriate sportspeople in Austria
Expatriate footballers in Germany
Expatriate footballers in Austria